Geopyxis vulcanalis, commonly known as the vulcan pixie cup, is a species of cup fungus in the family Pyronemataceae. It was first described scientifically in 1878 by American mycologist Charles Horton Peck, from collections made in the Adirondack Mountains in Upstate New York. Pier Andrea Saccardo transferred it to the genus Geopyxis in 1889. Fruitbodies of G. vulcanalis are small and cup-like, with a light yellow hymenium. They become somewhat flattened in age. It grows on the ground in unburned conifer litter, often with mosses. Its spores are smooth and elliptical, measuring 14–21 by 8–11 µm.

References

External links

Fungi described in 1878
Fungi of North America
Pyronemataceae
Taxa named by Charles Horton Peck